Menheniot was an electoral division of Cornwall in the United Kingdom which returned one member to sit on Cornwall Council between 2009 and 2021. It was abolished at the 2021 local elections, being split between the new divisions of Lynher, St Cleer and Menheniot, Looe East and Deviock, and Liskeard South and Dobwalls.

Councillors

Extent
Menheniot represented the villages of East Taphouse, Doublebois, St Keyne, Merrymeet, Menheniot and Quethiock, and the hamlets of Redpost, Treburgie Water, Trevelmond, St Pinnock, Trewidland, Horningtops, Pengover Green, Lower Clicker, Doddycross, Trehunist and Blunts. The village of Herodsfoot was shared with the Trelawny division.

The division was nominally abolished during boundary changes at the 2013 election, but this had little effect on the ward. Both before and after the boundary changes, the division covered 8,644 hectares in total.

Election results

2017 election

2016 by-election

2013 election

2009 election

References

Electoral divisions of Cornwall Council